Chapleau 74 is a First Nations reserve close to Chapleau, Ontario. It is one of the reserves of the Chapleau Ojibway First Nation.

References

External links
 Canada Lands Survey System

Ojibwe reserves in Ontario
Communities in Sudbury District